Obukhovo is a rural locality (a village) in Sidorovskoye Rural Settlement, Gryazovetsky District, Vologda Oblast, Russia. The population was 8 as of 2002.

Geography 
Obukhovo is located 38 km northeast of Gryazovets (the district's administrative centre) by road. Spasskoye is the nearest rural locality.

References 

Rural localities in Gryazovetsky District